Charles Croft may refer to:

Charles Croft (MP) for Orford (UK Parliament constituency)
Charles Croft, character in Just My Luck (1933 film)
Charlie Croft, footballer

See also
Charles Crofts (disambiguation)